Mountain was an American hard rock band from Long Island, New York. Formed in July 1969, the group originally consisted of guitarist and lead vocalist Leslie West, bassist and second vocalist Felix Pappalardi, drummer Norman "N. D." Smart and keyboardist Steve Knight. Pappalardi and Smart had performed on West's debut album Mountain earlier in the year (which was also produced by the bassist), and subsequently added Knight to complete the initial lineup of the band of the same name. Later in the year, Smart departed and was replaced by Canadian drummer Laurence "Corky" Laing. The group released three commercially successful albums – Climbing! in 1970, and Nantucket Sleighride and Flowers of Evil in 1971 – before breaking up in early 1972 due to increasing tensions between band members.

By mid-1973, West and Pappalardi had reformed Mountain with new members Allan Schwartzberg (drums) and Bob Mann (rhythm guitar, keyboards), who together released the live album Twin Peaks from their only concert tour. Laing later returned to the group and Mann was replaced by David Perry, with the new lineup's first studio effort Avalanche released the following July. Mountain broke up for a second time after another tour, with its final show taking place on December 31, 1974. West subsequently embarked on a solo career, before reforming Mountain for a third time in 1981 with Laing on drums and Miller Anderson on bass. On April 17, 1983, founding member Pappalardi was killed by his wife and musical collaborator Gail Collins Pappalardi, in what was deemed to be an accidental shooting.

Mountain released Go for Your Life in 1985, which featured new bassist Mark Clarke. Shortly after its release and promotion, the group quietly disbanded again. West and Laing returned as Mountain in 1992, with new bassist Richie Scarlet. After changing personnel again by replacing Scarlet with Randy Coven and later Noel Redding, the group released its sixth studio album Man's World in 1996 with a returning Clarke on bass. After another breakup in 1998, Mountain returned in 2001 to record Mystic Fire, which featured session bassist Chuck Hearne alongside West and Laing. For the subsequent touring cycle, Scarlet returned to the band. James "Rev" Jones took over in 2008. West died of cardiac arrest on December 23, 2020.

Members

Timeline

Lineups

References

Mountain